Kevin Swanson (born April 18, 1980) is a Canadian ice hockey coach and former goaltender.

Early life 
Swanson played major junior hockey in the WHL with the Prince George Cougars and Kelowna Rockets. He was named to the 1999–2000 WHL West First All-Star Team after playing 68 games for the Rockets, to post a 25-40-3 record with seven shutouts and a 2.95 goals against average.

Career 
Swanson was selected by the Vancouver Canucks in the seventh round (189th overall) of the 1999 NHL Entry Draft. He played in the American Hockey League for the Manitoba Moose and in the ECHL for the Columbia Inferno. Since retiring as a player, Swanson has worked as a goaltending coach with the Lethbridge Hurricanes of the Western Hockey League (WHL).

Awards and honours

References

External links

1980 births
Living people
Canadian ice hockey goaltenders
Columbia Inferno players
Kelowna Rockets players
Manitoba Moose players
Prince George Cougars players
Vancouver Canucks draft picks
Ice hockey people from Alberta